Biathanatos (from Greek Βιαθανατος meaning "violent death") is a work by the English writer and clergyman John Donne. Written in 1608 and published after his death, it contains a heterodox defense of "self-homicide" (suicide), listing prominent Biblical examples including Jesus, Samson, Saul, and Judas Iscariot. Thomas De Quincey responds to the work in his "On Suicide", and Jorge Luis Borges responds in "Biathanatos".

Contents
Donne begins by addressing his patron, Phillip Harbert, then divides the book, after a preface, into three parts, each part divided into distinctions, each distinction divided into sections. The first part focuses on "The Law of Nature", the second on "The Law of Reason", and the third on "The Law of God", before ending with a conclusion.

Sources

Modern Edition 
 .

Prose works by John Donne
1608 books
Books about suicide